Dimitri Leonidas (born 14 November 1987) is an English actor, best known for his roles in The Monuments Men, Rosewater and Riviera.

Early life
Leonidas was born on 14 November 1987 in Brent, London, the son of a Greek Cypriot father and an English mother. He also has Welsh ancestry through his mother. He has three sisters: Stephanie and Georgina, both actresses, and Helena, a teacher.

Career
Leonidas first appeared in a film in 1997, as an extra in Charles Sturridge's FairyTale: A True Story. His first speaking part came in 2001 in the BBC series Grange Hill, in which he stayed for four seasons. Until 2008, he was credited mostly as Shane Leonidas.

In 2009, he co-starred in the teen horror Tormented, and in 2010 he appeared in Centurion, starring Michael Fassbender. In the following years, his works included the TV series Sinbad, a guest role in Doctor Who and the Spanish film Animals.

Leonidas had a breakthrough year in 2013: he was cast by George Clooney in his Second World War drama The Monuments Men, starring Clooney himself, Matt Damon, Bill Murray and Cate Blanchett. He also landed a role in Jon Stewart's Rosewater. This led him to be named as one of Screen International's Stars of Tomorrow.

In 2015, Leonidas had a brief role in the Emmy-nominated television film Killing Jesus. He then appeared in the action film Renegades and in the comedy-horror Kill Ben Lyk. From 2017 to 2019, he was part of the cast of the series Riviera, followed by a role in the Netflix science fiction/crime-drama The One.

Filmography

Television

Film

Theatre

References

External links 
 

1987 births
English people of Greek Cypriot descent
English male television actors
English television actors
Living people
People from the London Borough of Brent
Male actors from London
21st-century English male actors
English male film actors
English male child actors
English people of Welsh descent